Manske is a surname. Notable people with the surname include:

Edgar Manske (1912–2002), American football player
John T. Manske (born 1952), American politician
Lou Manske (1884–1963), American baseball player
Magnus Manske (born 1974), German software developer

Low German surnames